John Allday may refer to:

 John Alday, 16th-century English translator
 John Allday (Coxswain)  fictional character in the 1800 Richard Bolitho novels by Douglas Reeman